Egan Chutes Provincial Park is located  east of Bancroft, Ontario, Canada. It was established as a provincial park in 1989 but is a non-operating park. Egan chutes is classified as a nature reserve, protecting a section of the York River.

History 
Egan Chutes Provincial Park was founded in 1989. The park is named after John Egan, a lumber baron.

This addition has separate classification (Waterway) from the original park (Nature Reserve).

Geology 
Egan Chutes Provincial Park is located in the mineral capital of Canada. Nepheline, Biotite, Zircon, Blue Corundum and Sodalite - which is local to the area. Rock and mineral collecting is prohibited in the park.

Recreational activities 
Canoeing, sport hunting, camping, hiking, and picnicking are among the activities available at Egan Chutes Provincial Park. The hike is about a 10 to 20 minute walk along the side of the York River. At the end there are three waterfalls: Middle Chute, Farm Chute, and Egan Chute.

York River is used for canoeing. Within the nature reserve, there are white water extensions associated with the three slideways. Each chute has a fixed conveyor; due to the very steep terrain, transportation is short but difficult. Downstream of the three chutes, the river winds its way, wide and slow. A  canoe-free trip from the lower part of the Farm Chute to the northernmost boundary of the waterway is possible, with two launching sites along the way.

Winter leisure activities include snowshoeing, cross-country skiing and snowmobiling. There are no licensed snowmobile trails in the park, and snowmobile use is largely restricted to the east side of the river.

References

External links 

Provincial parks of Ontario
Protected areas of Hastings County